In organic chemistry, thioketenes are organosulfur compounds analogous to ketenes with the general formula , where R is alkyl or aryl.  The parent thioketene (ethenthione) is has the formula . It is the simplest thioketene.  Thioketene is stable as a gas, but like most thioketenes, it polymerizes upon condensation.  

Some thioketenes are produced as transient species upon pyrolysis of 1,2,3-thiadiazoles.

Isolable thioketenes
Thioketenes can be stabilized by either steric protection or by electronic effects.  Thus, di-tert-butylthioketene is easily isolated and air-stable. Several examples have been characterized by X-ray crystallography.  The C=S distance is 157 pm and the C=C distance is 124 pm, both bonds being suitable for the C=C=S assignment. The violet color characteristic of thioketenes indicates the small HOMO-LUMO gap.  These compound are prepared by treatment of the acid chloride with phosphorus pentasulfide as described by the following idealized equation:

Bis(trifluoromethyl)thioketene is an example of an electronically stabilized thioketene.

Reactions
Thioketenes are electrophilic.  They add amines to give thioamides:

With peroxyacids, they produce thioketene-S-oxides:

Thioketenes bind to metal carbonyls giving adducts.

Related compounds
 carbon subsulfide.

It has been suggested that thioketene could be involved in cell damage processes.

References

Sulfur(−II) compounds
Ketenes
Functional groups